Allan Chapman FRAS (born 30 May 1946) is a British historian of science.

Biography
Allan Chapman was born in Swinton, Lancashire, England and grew up in the Pendlebury and Clifton districts of the then Swinton and Pendlebury borough. Having attended the local Cromwell Road Secondary Modern School for Boys, Sefton Road, Pendlebury (1957–1962), he then gained his first degree from the University of Lancaster. Subsequently, he undertook a history of science DPhil at Wadham College, Oxford. He is a historian by training and his special interests are astronomy and scientific biography.

Chapman has been based at the University of Oxford for most of his career, as a member of the Faculty of History, based at Wadham College. He is an accomplished lecturer and public speaker (including as visiting professor at Gresham College in London). In January 1994, he delivered the Royal Society history of science Wilkins Lecture, on the subject of Edmund Halley.

He is also a television presenter, notably Gods in the Sky, covering astronomical religion in early civilisations, and Great Scientists, presenting the lives of five of the greatest thinkers. Not averse to other forms of television, he also participated in the TV quiz University Challenge – The Professionals as part of the Royal Astronomical Society team, broadcast in June–July 2006.

Chapman teaches for the study abroad programme of Eurospring for Minnesota State University, Moorhead, Minnesota, USA and Bemidji State University, Bemidji, Minnesota, USA.

He has written many books including biographies such as England's Leonardo on Robert Hooke.

Chapman is a Fellow of the Royal Astronomical Society. He is a founder member and president of the Society for the History of Astronomy (SHA). He received an honorary doctorate from the University of Central Lancashire in 2004. He is the Honorary President and a member of Salford Astronomical Society, Honorary President of Reading Astronomical Society, Honorary President of the Mexborough & Swinton Astronomical Society, Honorary President of Orwell Astronomical Society (Ipswich) and Vice-President of the Newbury Astronomical Society. President of Preston and District Astronomical Society

Selected bibliography 

 William Crabtree 1610–1644: Manchester's First Mathematician, Allan Chapman. Manchester Statistical Society, 1996. .
 The Victorian Amateur Astronomer: Independent Astronomical Research in Britain, 1820–1920, Allan Chapman. Praxis Publishing, Wiley-Praxis Series in Astronomy & Astrophysics, 1996. . Second edition, Publisher, Gracewing. -100. 2017. 
 Astronomical Instruments and Their Users: Tycho Brahe to William Lassell, Allan Chapman. Ashgate, Variorum Collected Studies, 1996. .
 Patrick Moore's Millennium Yearbook: The View from AD 1001, Patrick Moore and Allan Chapman. Springer-Verlag, 1999. .
 Gods in the Sky: Astronomy from the Ancients to the Enlightenment, Allan Chapman. Channel 4 Books, 2002. .
 Mary Somerville: And the World of Science, Allan Chapman. Canopus Publishing, 2004. .
 England's Leonardo: Robert Hooke and the Seventeenth-century Scientific Revolution, Allan Chapman. Institute of Physics Publishing, 2004. .
 Robert Hooke and the English Renaissance, Allan Chapman and Paul Kent (editors). Gracewing, 2005. .
 Slaying the Dragons: Destroying Myths in the History of Science and Faith, Allan Chapman. Lion Hudson, 2013. .
 Physicians, Plagues and Progress: the History of Western Medicine from Antiquity to Antibiotics, Allan Chapman. Lion Hudson, 2016. .

See also 

 List of visiting Gresham professors

References

External links 
 University of Oxford History Faculty entry
 Society for the History of Astronomy
 Books from Amazon.co.uk
 England's Leonardo lecture (Robert Hooke)
 England's Leonardo book review in the New Scientist magazine
 Gods in the Sky on Channel 4
 University of Central Lancashire Honorary Doctorate 2004, including a short biography
'Scientists and Craftsmen in Sir Christopher Wren's London', lecture given at Gresham College, 23 April 2008 (available in text, audio and video formats).
Mexborough & Swinton Astronomical Society website
 Orwell Astronomical Society (Ipswich) website
 Newbury Astronomical Society website
 Reading Astronomical Society website
 Audio podcast on www.astrotalkuk.org on Science and Religion

1946 births
English historians
English television presenters
Alumni of Wadham College, Oxford
Alumni of Lancaster University
People from Swinton, Greater Manchester
People from Pendlebury
Living people
Historians of astronomy
Historians of science
Fellows of Wadham College, Oxford
Fellows of the Royal Astronomical Society